The Sedgwick family is a predominantly American family originating in England. Members of the family and their descendants have been influential in politics, law, business, and the arts. The earliest known member of the Sedgwick family to have gone to the New World from England was Robert Sedgwick of Yorkshire, England, who arrived in 1636 in the Massachusetts Bay Colony, as part of the Great Migration. Sedgwick, Maine, was named in his honor. The Sedgwick Pie is the family's cemetery located in Stockbridge Cemetery, Stockbridge, Massachusetts.

Family tree

Ancestors

 Major General Robert Sedgwick (1611–1656)
 William Sedgwick (c. 1643–1674)
 Samuel Sedgwick, Cpt. (1667–?)
 Benjamin Sedgwick, Deacon (1716–1757)

Main line

 Theodore Sedgwick (1746–1813), an American attorney, politician and jurist
 Elizabeth Mason Sedgwick (1775–1827)
 Frances Pamela Sedgwick (1778-1842)
 Theodore Sedgwick Jr. (1780–1839) married to Susan Anne Ridley Sedgwick
 Henry Dwight Sedgwick I (1785–1831)
 Henry Dwight Sedgwick II (1824–1903)
 Ellery Sedgwick (1872–1960) magazine editor
 Ellery Sedgwick, Jr. (1908–1991)
 Theodore "Tod" Sedgwick, diplomat and publisher 
 Henry Dwight Sedgwick III (1861–1957), lawyer and author
 Francis Minturn Sedgwick (1904–1967)
 Edith Minturn "Edie" Sedgwick (1943–1971), model who worked with Andy Warhol
 Robert Minturn Sedgwick (1899–1976)
 Henry Dwight Sedgwick V (1928–2018), married to Patricia Ann Sedgwick (1932-2003) and Helen Stern (1930–2019)
 Mike Stern (born Michael Sedgwick 1953), jazz guitarist 
 Kyra Minturn Sedgwick (born 1965) actress, producer, and director. Married to Kevin Bacon
  Sosie Bacon (born 1992),  actress
 Holly Sedgwick (born c. 1955)
 Justin Nozuka (born 1988)
 George Nozuka (born 1986)
 Philip Nozuka (born 1987)
Robert Sedgwick (born 1951) actor 
 Henry Dwight Sedgwick IV (1896–1914)
Catharine Maria Sedgwick (1789–1867) novelist

Connected people
 William Ellery
 Elizabeth Freeman, slave freed by Theodore Sedgwick
 Edith Minturn Stokes, sister-in-law of Henry Dwight Sedgwick III
 Dwight family
 Henry deForest, maternal grandfather of Edie Sedgwick
 Ephraim Williams
 Eero Saarinen
 Edmund Bacon (architect)
 Peabody family

References

 
Family trees